Manoug Exerjian (August 20, 1892 or 1888 – November 5, 1974) was a Nassau County, New York architect, who came to Great Neck, New York, in 1923.

Biography 
A native of Constantinople, he graduated from the Royal School of Architecture in Istanbul in 1914. He designed the Manhasset, New York Medical Center and hospital.

He came to prominence after winning first prize, $750, in a competition for best design of a Broadway (Manhattan) block front. Specifically, the contest featured hypothetical drawings of the east side of Times Square, between 44th Street and 45th Street. Exerjian resided at 147 East 33rd Street (Manhattan) when his plan was victorious in December 1933.

Career as designer

Exerjian owned and designed four houses located at Cannon Place, near 288th Street, the Bronx, in 1927. He owned several plots of land on lower Lexington Avenue (Manhattan), which were purchased from him in February 1929.

In March 1934 Exerjian advised that $25,000,000 in allocated United States Federal Government funds, be used to make alterations in existing dwellings in the Lower East Side. He stressed that the same sum of money, when used to build several blocks of new housing,  would perpetuate the existence of slums much longer. This would occur because private capital would not be capable of competing profitably with tax exempt housing.

Exergian designed a group of three apartment houses on Queens Boulevard between 66th Avenue and 67th Drive, in Forest Hills, New York. Designed in the six story garden style, in 1937, the three apartment units covered a block measuring 600 feet. 212 apartments and 14 stores were planned for the area.

As president of Houses For Modern Living, Inc., Exerjian built and sold 24 lots, three blocks from the Eighth Avenue subway, in November 1940. The development was on the south side of Austin Street, east of Yellowstone Boulevard, in Forest Hills. Earlier he built and sold several private homes in the area.

Death

Exerjian died in November 1974 at the age of 86 at Manhasset Hospital. At the time, he resided at 18 Bonnie Heights Road, in the Manhasset section of Flower Hill.

Works
1927: Four houses located at Cannon Place, near 288th Street, the Bronx 
1934: Crypt of Holy Cross Armenian Apostolic Church (New York City)
1937: Three six-story apartment houses on Queens Boulevard between 66th Avenue and 67th Drive, in Forest Hills, New York
1952-1953: Renovation and refacing of Holy Cross Armenian Apostolic Church (New York City)

References

19th-century births
1974 deaths
Architects from Istanbul
20th-century American architects
Ethnic Armenian architects
Armenians from the Ottoman Empire
American ecclesiastical architects
Companies based in Manhattan
Emigrants from the Ottoman Empire to the United States
American people of Armenian descent
People from Manhasset, New York
People from Great Neck, New York
Flower Hill, New York
Architects from New York City